Bank of Shanghai Headquarters is a 46 floor tower in the Pudong area of Shanghai and was completed in 2005. It was built by architects Kenzo Tange Associates.

In popular culture
It was one of the three buildings that were part of the filming of Mission: Impossible III starring Tom Cruise.

See also
 List of tallest buildings in Shanghai

References

External links
 
 

Bank headquarters in China
Office buildings completed in 2005
Skyscraper office buildings in Shanghai